Feliciano López was the defending champion but lost in the first round.
Alejandro Falla  won the final against Santiago Giraldo 7–5, 6–3.

Seeds

Draw

Finals

Top half

Bottom half

References
 Main Draw
 Qualifying Draw

Open Seguros Bolivar - Singles
2012 MS